"Never Enough" is a song by English rock band the Cure, released as a single in September 1990 from their 1990 remix album, Mixed Up. The song topped the US Billboard Modern Rock Tracks chart, reached number three in Finland, and peaked within the top 20 in Germany, Ireland, New Zealand, Spain, and the United Kingdom.

Content
Unlike most other Cure songs of this era, the song was unexpectedly guitar-oriented, featuring no synthesizers. On the album, it is subtitled "Big Mix". 

While containing no synthesisers, the song was nonetheless influenced by baggy music. The song's largely electronic B-side "Harold and Joe" was described by Chris Ott of Pitchfork as a "phenomenally adorable ecstasy tribute."

Although Perry Bamonte is on the single cover and appears in the music video, he does not have a songwriting credit (as do the other four members).

Release
Upon release as a single, "Never Enough" topped the Billboard Modern Rock Tracks chart for three weeks, and reached number 13 in the United Kingdom.

The song was re-recorded using acoustic guitars for the 2001 Acoustic Hits album, which contains re-recordings of songs by the band, and was released as a bonus disc to Greatest Hits.

Track listings
7-inch
 "Never Enough" – 4:28
 "Harold and Joe" – 5:05

12-inch
 "Never Enough" (Big Mix) – 6:07
 "Harold and Joe" – 5:05
 "Let's Go to Bed" (Milk Mix) – 7:16

CD and cassette
 "Never Enough" (Big Mix) – 6:07
 "Harold and Joe" – 5:05
 "Let's Go to Bed" (Milk Mix) – 7:16
 "Never Enough" – 4:28

Personnel
 Robert Smith – vocals, guitar
 Simon Gallup – bass guitar
 Porl Thompson – guitar
 Boris Williams – drums
 Mark Saunders – mixing, remixing

Charts

See also
 Number one modern rock hits of 1990

References

External links
 

1990 singles
1990 songs
The Cure songs
Fiction Records singles
Song recordings produced by Mark Saunders
Songs written by Perry Bamonte
Songs written by Porl Thompson
Songs written by Robert Smith (musician)
Songs written by Simon Gallup